Dr. Leon Geršković (2 February 1910 – 1 April 1992) was a Croatian-Jewish lawyer, legal scholar and politician.

Geršković was born in Bučje, Pleternica on 2 February 1910. He attended the Faculty of Law at the University of Zagreb and graduated in 1933. Since 1935, he was a member of the Communist Party of Yugoslavia. Geršković was an active member of the syndicate at the textile factory "Hermann Pollack & Sohn" in Zagreb. After graduation, Geršković worked as a lawyer, when in 1940 he opened his own private law office. Geršković joined the Partisans in 1941. In 1943, he became the first editor of Slobodna Dalmacija. From 1944, Geršković was the chief of administration at ZAVNOH. He was a recipient of the Commemorative Medal of the Partisans of 1941. Repeatedly he was the elected member of the SFR Yugoslavia National Assembly, state secretary at the federal executive council and member of the Parliament of the Socialist Republic of Croatia. He was a university professor who taught constitutional law and the municipal system. Geršković was one of the founders of Faculty of Political Science at the University of Zagreb in 1962, and its first dean until 1965. Also, he was a professor at the University of Belgrade Faculty of Law. Geršković started the journal "Politička Misao". Between 1946 and 1974, Geršković participated in the writing of the constitution of Yugoslavia. He died on 1 April 1992 in Zagreb and was buried at the Mirogoj Cemetery.

Works
 Dokumenti o razvoju narodne vlasti (1946)
 Historija narodne vlasti (1950)
 Nauka o administraciji (1951)
 Društveno upravljanje u Jugoslaviji (1957)
 Polazne osnove pravnog sistema u udruženom radu (1972)
 Ustavne teme (1976)
 Socijalistička zajednica rada (1976)

References

Bibliography

 
 
 
 

1910 births
1992 deaths
People from Pleternica
Croatian Jews
Austro-Hungarian Jews
Jewish socialists
Jews in the Yugoslav Partisans
Croatian Austro-Hungarians
Faculty of Law, University of Zagreb alumni
Academic staff of the University of Zagreb
Academic staff of the University of Belgrade
Croatian lawyers
Croatian politicians
Jewish Croatian politicians
Croatian communists
Croatian people of World War II
Yugoslav Partisans members
Burials at Mirogoj Cemetery
Yugoslav lawyers